William, Lord of Douglas can refer to several chiefs of the House of Douglas, an historic and warlike Scots family.

William I, Lord of Douglas (c. 1174–1213)
William II, Lord of Douglas (c. 1220–1274)
William III, Lord of Douglas (c. 1240–1298)
William IV, Lord of Douglas (died 1333) 
William Douglas, 1st Earl of Douglas (1327–1384)
William Douglas, 6th Earl of Douglas (1426–1440)
William Douglas, 8th Earl of Douglas (1425–1452)